Gerald Verner White  (July 6, 1879 – October 24, 1948) was a Canadian politician.

Born in Pembroke, Ontario, the son of Peter White and Janet Reid White, White was educated at Pembroke Public and High Schools. He received a Bachelor of Science in Mining Engineering degree in 1901 from McGill University. He entered the lumber business, eventually becoming president of the Cunningham Lumber Company and the Pembroke Standard, Limited.

He was first elected to the House of Commons of Canada for Renfrew North in a 1906 by-election after the death of his father. A Conservative, he was re-elected in 1908 and 1911. During World War I, he was a Colonel, Officer Reserve in the Canadian Expeditionary Force. He was appointed a Commander of the Order of the British Empire in the 1918 New Year Honours for his efforts during the war.

He was appointed to the Senate of Canada for the senatorial division of Pembroke, Ontario on the advice of Robert Borden in 1917. He served until his death in 1948.

References

Notes
 
 

1879 births
1948 deaths
Canadian military personnel of World War I
Canadian senators from Ontario
Canadian Commanders of the Order of the British Empire
Conservative Party of Canada (1867–1942) MPs
Conservative Party of Canada (1867–1942) senators
McGill University Faculty of Engineering alumni
Members of the House of Commons of Canada from Ontario
People from Pembroke, Ontario